The white-headed woodpecker (Leuconotopicus albolarvatus) is a non-migratory woodpecker that resides in pine forests of the mountains of western North America.

Description
It has white primary feathers that form a crescent in flight. Males have a red spot at the back of the head.

Distribution and habitat
The range of the white-headed woodpecker stretches in the mountains from British Columbia through southern California. They form nests in dead trees or snags and reproduce once per year.

Taxonomy
Most of the range is occupied by the nominate subspecies. In the southern part of the range, L. a. gravirostris, which has a longer bill - especially in males - and tail, is only found on mountaintops of the San Gabriel Mountains to San Diego County. Birds on Mount Pinos are somewhat intermediate. mtDNA cytochrome b and ATP synthase subunit 6 sequence data confirms this arrangement and also suggests that the Mount Pinos birds are closer to L. a. gravirostris (Alexander & Burns, 2006). Apparently, the larger bill of the southern subspecies is an adaptation for being better able to feed on the large, spiny cones of Coulter pines (Pinus coulteri). Some taxonomic authorities, including the American Ornithological Society, continue to place this species in the genus Picoides.

References

External links 

 USGS Forest and Rangeland birds
 White-headed woodpecker, a bibliographic resource
 
 

white-headed woodpecker
Native birds of Western Canada
Native birds of the Northwestern United States
Native birds of the West Coast of the United States
Birds of the Sierra Nevada (United States)
Fauna of the California chaparral and woodlands
white-headed woodpecker
white-headed woodpecker